Dorothea (minor planet designation: 339 Dorothea) is a large main belt asteroid that was discovered by German astronomer Max Wolf on 25 September 1892 in Heidelberg.

This is a member of the dynamic Eos family of asteroids that were probably formed as the result of a collisional breakup of a parent body.

References

External links 
 
 

000339
Discoveries by Max Wolf
Named minor planets
000339
000339
18920925